Linus Albrecht Christoph Müller (born 2 December 1999) is a German field hockey player who plays as a defender for Bundesliga club Mannheimer HC and the German national team.

He competed in the 2020 Summer Olympics. His father Albrecht Müller was an Olympic rower.

Club career
Müller started playing hockey at age four at Düsseldorfer HC. In 2018 he signed for Mannheimer HC.

References

External links

1999 births
Living people
Sportspeople from Düsseldorf
Field hockey players at the 2020 Summer Olympics
German male field hockey players
Olympic field hockey players of Germany
Male field hockey defenders
Men's Feldhockey Bundesliga players
Mannheimer HC players
21st-century German people